Bromopyruvic acid is the organic compound with the formula BrCH2COCO2H.  This colorless solid is the brominated derivative of pyruvic acid. It bears structural similarity to lactic acid and pyruvic acid.  It has been investigated as a metabolic poison and an anticancer agent.  Like other α-bromoketones, it is a strong alkylating agent.

Research 
The pyruvate transporter system can be used to deliver bromopyruvate inside trypanosomal cells.  Once intracellular, the primary target of 3BP is glyceraldehyde-3-phosphate dehydrogenase, which is highly sensitive to inhibition by bromopyruvate. The pyruvate transporter system, which is known to be overexpressed in cancer cells, was later identified to be a monocarboxylate transporter called monocarboxylate transporter 1.

References

External links
 
 
 
 
 The cancer cell's "power plants" as promising therapeutic targets: An overview, by Peter Pederson

Alkylating agents
Propionic acids
Organobromides
Alpha-keto acids